A disaster is an event that seriously disrupts a society or environment.

Disaster may also refer to:

Arts, entertainment, and media
Disaster (film), a 1948 drama film directed by William H. Pine
"Disaster" (Dave song)
"Disaster" (JoJo song), 2011
"Disaster" (Star Trek: The Next Generation), a season 5 episode of Star Trek: The Next Generation
Disaster: Day of Crisis, a video game by Monolith Soft for the Wii
Disaster! (musical), a 2016 Broadway musical
Major Disaster, a former DC Comics supervillain and reluctant amoral superhero
"Disaster", an episode of The Good Doctor
"Disaster", a song by Relient K from the 2013 album Collapsible Lung

Other uses
Disaster!, an attraction at Universal Studios Florida
Natural disaster, such as a geologic process, hurricane, or earthquake

See also
Anthropogenic hazard, a human-caused disaster, including industrial and transport accidents as well as deliberate attacks such as terrorism or war
 Calamity (disambiguation)
 Catastrophe (disambiguation)
Desaster, a German metal band
Dishaster, Atari 2600 game